Dana Heller is the dean of the College of Arts and Sciences at Eastern Michigan University. Previously she was the chair of the English Department at Old Dominion University (ODU) and in 2016–2017, was interim dean at their College of Arts and Letters.

Heller is on the board of Jurors for the Peabody Awards.

Early life and education
Her undergraduate degree is from Goddard College where she majored in English and theater. From Columbia University she earned a master's degree in creative writing. The Graduate Center, CUNY awarded her a Ph.D. in Wnglish.

Career
At ODU, she was also Director of the Humanities Institute and Graduate Program.

Publications
Family Plots: The De-Oedipalization of Popular Culture
editor of Cross Purposes: Lesbians, Feminists, and the Limits of Alliance

References

American university and college faculty deans
Old Dominion University faculty
Eastern Michigan University people
Goddard College alumni
Columbia University School of the Arts alumni
Graduate Center, CUNY alumni
Year of birth missing (living people)
Living people